Lower Cove is a small community located in Cumberland County, Nova Scotia, Canada.  It is the site of historic sandstone quarrying and grindstone production.

References 

Communities in Cumberland County, Nova Scotia